Raisa Vladimirovna Mamentyeva (Moscow, 5 March 1927 – 2 December 2001) was a Russian basketball player. She won four gold European medals with the Soviet Union women's national basketball team.

References 

1927 births
2001 deaths
Soviet women's basketball players